Alipurduars Lok Sabha constituency is one of the 543 parliamentary constituencies in India. The constituency centres on Alipurduar in West Bengal. While five assembly segments of No. 2 Alipurduars Lok Sabha constituency are in Alipurduar district, one segment is in Cooch Behar district and one segment is in Jalpaiguri district. The seat is reserved for scheduled tribes.

Assembly segments

As per order of the Delimitation Commission in respect of the delimitation of constituencies in the West Bengal, parliamentary constituency no. 2 Alipurduars, reserved for Scheduled tribes (ST), is composed of the following assembly segments from 2009:

Members of the Parliament

General election results

General election 2019

General election 2014

General election 2009

General elections 1977-2004
Most of the contests were multi-cornered. However, only winners and runners-up are mentioned below:

See also
 Alipurduar
 List of Constituencies of the Lok Sabha

References

External links
Alipurduarsr lok sabha  constituency election 2019 date and schedule

Lok Sabha constituencies in West Bengal
Politics of Alipurduar district